Distributed Proofreaders (commonly abbreviated as DP or PGDP) is a web-based project that supports the development of e-texts for Project Gutenberg by allowing many people to work together in proofreading drafts of e-texts for errors. As of March 2021, the site had digitized 41,000 titles.

History 

Distributed Proofreaders was founded by Charles Franks in 2000 as an independent site to assist Project Gutenberg. Distributed Proofreaders became an official Project Gutenberg site in 2002.

On 8 November 2002, Distributed Proofreaders was slashdotted, and more than 4,000 new members joined in one day, causing an influx of new proofreaders and software developers, which helped to increase the quantity and quality of e-text production. Distributed Proofreaders posted their 5,000th text to Project Gutenberg in October 2004, in March 2007, the 10,000th DP-produced e-text was posted to Project Gutenberg, in May 2009, the 15,000th DP-produced e-text was posted to Project Gutenberg, in April 2011, the 20,000th DP-produced e-text was posted to Project Gutenberg, and in July 2015, the 30,000th DP-produced e-text was posted to Project Gutenberg. DP-contributed e-texts comprised more than half of works in Project Gutenberg, .

On 31 July 2006, the Distributed Proofreaders Foundation was formed to provide Distributed Proofreaders with its own legal entity and not-for-profit status. IRS approval of section 501(c)(3) status was granted retroactive to 7 April 2006.

Proofreading process 

Public domain works, typically books with expired copyright, are scanned by volunteers, or sourced from digitization projects and the images are run through optical character recognition (OCR) software. Since OCR software is far from perfect, many errors often appear in the resulting text. To correct them, pages are made available to volunteers via the Internet; the original page image and the recognized text appear side by side. This process thereby distributes the time-consuming error-correction process, akin to distributed computing.

Each page is proofread and formatted several times, and then a post-processor combines the pages and prepares the text for uploading to Project Gutenberg.

Besides custom software created to support the project, DP also runs a forum and a wiki for project coordinators and participants.

Related projects

DP Europe 
In January 2004, Distributed Proofreaders Europe started, hosted by Project Rastko, Serbia. This site had the ability to process text in Unicode UTF-8 encoding. Books proofread centered on European culture, with a considerable proportion of non-English texts including Hebrew, Arabic, Urdu, and many others. , DP Europe had produced 787 e-texts, the last of these in November 2011.

The original DP is sometimes referred to as "DP International" by members of DP Europe. However, DP servers are located in the United States, and therefore works must be cleared by Project Gutenberg as being in the public domain according to U.S. copyright law before they can be proofread and eventually published at DP.

DP Canada 
In December 2007, Distributed Proofreaders Canada launched to support the production of e-books for Project Gutenberg Canada and take advantage of shorter Canadian copyright terms. Although it was established by members of the original Distributed Proofreaders site, it is a separate entity. All its projects are posted to Faded Page, their book archive website. In addition, it supplies books to Project Gutenberg Canada (which launched on Canada Day 2007) and (where copyright laws are compatible) to the original Project Gutenberg.

In addition to preserving Canadiana, DP Canada is notable because it is the first major effort to take advantage of Canada's copyright laws which may allow more works to be preserved. Unlike copyright law in some other countries, Canada has a "life plus 50" copyright term. This means that works by authors who died more than fifty years ago may be preserved in Canada, whereas in other parts of the world those works may not be distributed because they are still under copyright.

Notable authors whose works may be preserved in Canada but not in other parts of the world include Clark Ashton Smith, Dashiell Hammett, Ernest Hemingway, Carl Jung, A. A. Milne, Dorothy Sayers, Nevil Shute, Walter de la Mare, Sheila Kaye-Smith and Amy Carmichael.

Milestones

10,000th E-book 

On 9 March 2007, Distributed Proofreaders announced the completion of more than 10,000 titles. In celebration, a collection of fifteen titles was published:
 Slave Narratives, Oklahoma (A Folk History of Slavery in the United States From Interviews with Former Slaves) by the U.S. Work Projects Administration (English)
 Eighth annual report of the Bureau of ethnology. (1891 N 08 / 1886–1887) edited by John Wesley Powell (English)
 R. Caldecott's First Collection of Pictures and Songs by Randolph Caldecott [Illustrator] (English)
 Como atravessei Àfrica (Volume II) by Serpa Pinto (Portuguese)
 Triplanetary by E. E. "Doc" Smith (English)
 Heidi by Johanna Spyri (English)
 Heimatlos by Johanna Spyri (German)
 October 27, 1920 issue of Punch (English)
 Sylva, or, A Discourse of Forest-Trees by John Evelyn (English)
 Encyclopedia of Needlework by Therese de Dillmont (English)
 The annals of the Cakchiquels by Francisco Ernantez Arana (fl. 1582), translated and edited by Daniel G. Brinton (1837–1899) (English with Central American Indian)
 The Shanty Book, Part I, Sailor Shanties (1921) by Richard Runciman Terry (1864–1938) (English)
 Le marchand de Venise by William Shakespeare, translated by François Guizot (French)
 Agriculture for beginners, Rev. ed. by Charles William Burkett (English)
 Species Plantarum (Part 1) by Carl Linnaeus (Carl von Linné) (Latin)

20,000th E-book 
On April 10, 2011, the 20,000th book milestone was celebrated as a group release of bilingual books:
 The Renaissance in Italy–Italian Literature, Vol 1, John Addington Symonds (English with Italian)
 Märchen und Erzählungen für Anfänger; erster Teil, H. A. Guerber (German with English)
 Gedichte und Sprüche, Walther von der Vogelweide (Middle High German (ca. 1050-1500) with German)
 Studien und Plaudereien im Vaterland, Sigmon Martin Stern (German with English)
 Caos del Triperuno, Teofilo Folengo (Italian with Latin)
 Niederländische Volkslieder, Hoffmann von Fallersleben (German with Dutch)
 A "San Francisco", Salvatore Di Giacomo (Italian with Neapolitan)
 O' voto, Salvatore Di Giacomo (Italian with Neapolitan)
 De Latino sine Flexione & Principio de Permanentia, Giuseppe Peano (1858-1932) (Latin with Latino sine Flexione)
 Cappiddazzu paga tuttu—Nino Martoglio, Luigi Pirandello (Italian with Sicilian)
 The International Auxiliary Language Esperanto, George Cox (English with Esperanto)
 Lusitania: canti popolari portoghesi, Ettore Toci (Italian with French)

30,000th E-book 
On 7 July 2015, the 30,000th book milestone was celebrated with a group of thirty texts. One was numbered 30,000:
Graded literature readers - Fourth book, editors: Harry Pratt Judson and Ida C. Bender, 1900

40,000th E-book 
On 10 October 2020, the 40,000th book milestone was celebrated with a group of 4 volumes of a book. One was numbered 40,000:
London Labour and the London Poor, Henry Mayhew

See also
List of digital library projects
Wikisource

References

External links

Collaborative projects
Crowdsourcing
Distributed computing projects
Human-based computation
Internet properties established in 2000
Mass digitization
Proofreading